The Hollow Earth is a concept proposing that the planet Earth is entirely hollow or contains a substantial interior space.

Hollow Earth may also refer to:
 The Hollow Earth, a 1990 novel by Rudy Rucker
Return to the Hollow Earth, a 2018 novel by Rudy Rucker
 Hollow Earth (album), a 1994 album by Soma
Hollow Earth Expedition, a 2006 role-playing game
 "The Hollow Earth", a song by Thom Yorke
 Hollow Earth (novel), a 2012 novel by John Barrowman and Carole Barrowman